The 1924 Loyola Wolf Pack football team was an American football team that represented Loyola College of New Orleans (now known as Loyola University New Orleans) as an independent during the 1924 college football season. In its first season under head coach Moon Ducote, the team compiled a 3–4–2 record and was outscored by a total of 145 to 98.

Schedule

References

Loyola
Loyola Wolf Pack football seasons
Loyola Wolf Pack football